Darvahi Rural District is in Ab Pakhsh District of Dashtestan County, Bushehr province, Iran. At the census of 2006, its population was 4,546 in 937 households, when it was in Shabankareh District. There were 3,056 inhabitants in 736 households at the following census of 2011, by which time the rural district was in the newly formed Ab Pakhsh District. At the most recent census of 2016, the population of the rural district was 3,211 in 931 households. The largest of its eight villages was Chahar Borj, with 1,294 people.

References 

Rural Districts of Bushehr Province
Populated places in Dashtestan County